Ompundja Constituency is an electoral constituency in the Oshana Region of Namibia. It had 4,423 inhabitants in 2004 and 2,520 registered voters . Its constituency office is situated in Enguwantale.

Geography
It is part of the Cuvelai Basin and dominated by flood plains which become swamps during the raining season.

Economy and infrastructure
The district road D3607 is the access road to Ompundja constituency. There are no other proclaimed roads in the constituency; Transport is done on tracks that frequently become impassable during the raining season. The main economic activity is subsistence agriculture. Ambassador, politician and businessperson Monica Nashandi was born here.

Politics
Ompundja constituency is traditionally a stronghold of the South West Africa People's Organization (SWAPO) party. The constituency's councillor is SWAPO politician Adolf Uunona, who has been serving in this role since 2004. Uunona rose to international attention in 2020 when news media picked up that his middle name is Hitler. Uunona stated in response that "my father gave me this name Adolf Hitler, but it does not mean I have Adolf Hitler's character".

In the 2015 Namibian regional elections, Uunona won uncontested and remained councillor after no opposition party nominated a candidate. Uunona was again reelected in the 2020 Namibian regional elections, winning with 1,196 votes over Abner Mumbala of the Independent Patriots for Change (IPC), an opposition party formed in August 2020, with 213 votes.

References

Constituencies of Oshana Region
States and territories established in 1992
1992 establishments in Namibia